Out of the Silent Planet is the debut studio album by the American progressive metal band King's X, released in 1988. The title of the album comes from that of a book by C.S. Lewis, an author favored by band members Ty Tabor and Jerry Gaskill. "Out of the Silent Planet" is also the title of the first track from the follow up album Gretchen Goes to Nebraska. The cover art features the skyline of Houston with the southern outline of the state of Texas. The album received widespread acclaim from music contemporaries. Pantera bassist Rex Brown commented of his and Dimebag Darrell's impressions, noting "Dime called me and said, ‘Dude, have you heard this? Have you checked out King’s X?'” He says. “We went on a long road trip, and we must have listened to that first record I don’t know how many times, and we couldn’t stop! This was the sound that Dime and I were always looking for.”

Track listing

All songs written by Gaskill, Pinnick and Tabor, except "Sometimes" and "Far, Far Away" written by Pinnick, Tabor, Gaskill and Marty Warren.

Personnel
King's X
Doug Pinnick – vocals & bass
Ty Tabor – guitar & vocals
Jerry Gaskill – drums & vocals

Production
Sam Taylor - producer
Steve Ames - engineer
Bob Ludwig - mastering at Masterdisk, New York
Jon Zazula, Marsha Zazula - executive producers

Charts
Album

Accolades

References

External links
Official King's X Site, Accessed on July 10, 2005.
Additional Information about the album, Accessed on April 26, 2006.
site francophone, Accessed on July 24, 2006.

King's X albums
1988 debut albums
Megaforce Records albums